Rebecca Langrehr (born 4 April 1998) is a German modern pentathlete.

She participated at the 2018 World Modern Pentathlon Championships, winning a medal.

References

External links

Living people
1998 births
German female modern pentathletes
World Modern Pentathlon Championships medalists
Modern pentathletes at the 2020 Summer Olympics
21st-century German women